William Haskell Coffin (October 21, 1878 – May 12, 1941) was a painter and commercial artist who flourished in the early decades of the twentieth century.  His work appeared on the cover of leading magazines in the United States and on posters that the US government commissioned.

Biography
Coffin was born in Charleston, South Carolina, on October 21, 1878, the son of Julia (Haskell) and George Mathewes Coffin. When he was young, his family moved to Washington, DC, where he attended the Corcoran School of Art. After a brief stint back in Charleston, where he painted portraits of society ladies, he went to France in 1902 to complete his training as an artist.

Coffin specialized in images of women, which were reproduced on the covers of popular magazines such as The Saturday Evening Post, The American Magazine, Redbook, McCall's, Leslie's Illustrated, and the Pictorial Review. He was one of the most highly paid illustrators of his era.

Coffin was married twice. His second wife was actress Frances Starr; they eventually divorced.

Coffin was being treated for depression in an institution in St. Petersburg, Florida, when he leaped from a third-floor window and died on May 12, 1941.

References

20th-century American painters
American male painters
1941 suicides
1878 births
Suicides in Florida
Painters who committed suicide
Suicides by jumping in the United States
20th-century American male artists